Jorge Pacheco may refer to:

Jorge Pacheco Areco (1920–1998), President of Uruguay
Jorge Pacheco Klein (born 1954), Uruguayan lawyer and politician, son of the above
Jorge Pacheco (footballer) (1889-1957), Uruguyan footballer